The following is a list of burial places of the Presidents of Turkey.

Presidential burial places

See also 

 List of burial places of Ottoman sultans
 List of burial places of presidents and vice presidents of the United States
 List of burial places of prime ministers of the United Kingdom
 Death and state funeral of Mustafa Kemal Atatürk

References

External links

 Funeral Ceremonies of the Presidents of the Republic of Turkey

Turkish presidents
Turkish presidents
Turkish presidents
Burial places,Turkish presidents